Stagecoach was a short-lived ski resort in Colorado in the early 1970s, located  south of Steamboat Springs in Routt County.

Ski area
The ski area was developed by the Woodmoor Company of Colorado Springs.  Although full of great terrain on north-facing slopes, financial problems of the developer nixed the project in 1973 and it closed after its second season of skiing in 1974.

Now considered a "lost" ski hill, rumors of Stagecoach reopening are common, but are always denied by the Wittemyer family, who have owned the property for over twenty-five years.

The ski area was a mile south of the present-day Stagecoach Reservoir, with north-facing slopes and three double chairlifts.

Chairlifts

Stagecoach State Park
The Stagecoach Dam was built on the Yampa River in late 1988, and its reservoir filled over the next several years. The reservoir now hosts Stagecoach State Park and offers fishing, boating, camping, hiking, and winter cross-country skiing and dog-sledding. Originally designed in the 1970s as an earthen dam, it is a roller-compacted concrete (RCC) structure.

Community
The community is now quickly growing, along with nearby Steamboat Springs. A new firehouse was built in 2006 and new neighborhoods are under development.  An elementary school site has been allocated when the current facility in nearby Yampa reaches capacity.

References

External links
Stage-Coach.com - homeowners' association - map of area

Defunct ski areas and resorts in Colorado
Geography of Routt County, Colorado